William Benjamin K.C. Ross (December 12, 1855 – January 10, 1929) was a Canadian politician, lawyer and businessman.

A lawyer by training, Ross practised law in Halifax, Nova Scotia. He also pursued business interests such as helping found the Halifax Electric Tramway Company Limited. Ross was appointed to the Senate of Canada as a Conservative in 1912 by Sir Robert Borden.

In January 1926, he was appointed Leader of the Opposition in the Canadian Senate by Tory leader Arthur Meighen, and served briefly as Government Leader in the Canadian Senate when Meighen formed a short-lived government later that year. After the Conservatives lost the 1926 election, Ross resumed his position as Opposition Leader. Ross remained in that position until his death in 1929.

External links
 

1855 births
1929 deaths
Canadian senators from Nova Scotia
Conservative Party of Canada (1867–1942) senators